Trondheim may refer to:

Trondheim, a city in Norway
Lewis Trondheim, a French cartoonist
KNM Trondheim, a ship in the design of the Oslo-class frigate